Mingo — sometimes known as Mingo Flats — is an unincorporated community in Randolph County, West Virginia, United States. It is named for the historic Iroquoian Mingo people.

References

Unincorporated communities in Randolph County, West Virginia
Unincorporated communities in West Virginia